Minuscule 301 (in the Gregory-Aland numbering), A156 (Soden), is a Greek minuscule manuscript of the New Testament, on parchment. Palaeographically it has been assigned to the 11th century. 
It has marginalia.

Description 

The codex contains a complete text of the four Gospels on 221 parchment leaves with a commentary. The text is written in one column per page, the biblical text in 22 lines per page, the text of a commentary in 48 lines per page.

It lacks  references to the Eusebian Canons.

Biblical text is surrounded by a catena. In the Gospel of Mark, the commentary is of Victorinus's authorship.

Text 

The Greek text of the codex is a representative of the Byzantine text-type. Aland placed it in Category V.
According to the Claremont Profile Method it belongs to the textual family Kx and creates textual pair with Minuscule 373 in Luke 1, Luke 10, and Luke 20.

The Pericope Adulterae (John 7:53-8:11) is placed at the end of John.

History 

The manuscript once belonged to Jean Hurault de Boistaillé (like codices 10, 203, 263, 306, 314).

The manuscript was added to the list of New Testament manuscripts by Scholz (1794-1852). 
It was examined and described by Scholz, Paulin Martin, and C. R. Gregory.

The manuscript is currently housed at the Bibliothèque nationale de France (Gr. 187) at Paris.

See also 

 List of New Testament minuscules
 Biblical manuscript
 Textual criticism

References

Further reading 

 
 Jean-Pierre-Paul Martin, Description technique des manuscrits grecs relatifs au Nouveau Testament, conservés dans les bibliothèques de Paris (Paris 1883), p. 78.

Greek New Testament minuscules
11th-century biblical manuscripts
Bibliothèque nationale de France collections